Bob McDonald (14 December 1895 – 1 July 1979) was an  Australian rules footballer who played with South Melbourne in the Victorian Football League (VFL).

Notes

External links 

1895 births
1979 deaths
Australian rules footballers from Victoria (Australia)
Sydney Swans players